John Stuart Scott (sometimes credited as John Scott or John S. Scott) is an American television director and producer who has directed episodes for several series including Glee, The Office and Chuck.

Television work 
Scott began his career behind the camera working on a number of films and television series and commercials starting in the early 1990s. In 2009, he made his directorial debut on drama series Nip/Tuck, and also directed the final episode of that series in 2010. He subsequently directed two episodes "Acafellas" and "The Rhodes Not Taken" of the first season of Glee, the third episode Andy's Play of the seventh season of the American version of The Office, and episodes for shows such as Scoundrels, Chuck, Love Bites, Gigantic, Outsourced, and American Horror Story.

References

External links 

Date of birth unknown
American television directors
Living people
People from Long Beach, California